Through Yourself & Back Again is the second and final studio album by American rock band Thriving Ivory. The lead single from the album, Where We Belong, was released on May 10, 2010 via a special limited time YouTube video. The next day, May 11, the single was released on iTunes, and in stores everywhere May 19. On July 16, the band released the track listing via their Twitter account.

The title of the album comes from the second verse of the song "Moonlight". The lyrics say, "We're gonna let go and let ourselves be found. We're gonna set fire 'til we grow tired and burn our sorrows to the ground. I'm gonna take your hand 'til you're through yourself and back again. We'll be dancing in the moonlight."

Promotion
On August 20, 2010 the band went on a 16-city fall tour with Ryan Star and Ed Kowalczyk to promote Through Yourself & Back Again ahead of its release, starting at Scottsdale's Martini Ranch and ending in Boston's Royale nightclub.

Track listing

Personnel
Adapted credits from the media notes of Through Yourself & Back Again.

Thriving Ivory
 Clayton Stroope – lead vocals
 Scott Jason – piano, keys
 Drew Cribley – guitars
 Paul Niedermier – drums, percussion

Additional musicians
Jack Daley – bass guitar
Curt Schneider – bass guitar (tracks 1, 2, 4)
Scott Jason – strings (tracks 4, 5)
Gregg Wattenberg – string arrangement (track 4)
David Eggar – cello, string arrangement (track 4)
Lorenza Ponce – violin, string arrangement (track 5)

Production
Mark Endert – mixing, additional programming
Brian Montgomery – mixing, digital editing (tracks 6, 8), additional engineering
Doug Johnson – digital editing (tracks 1, 2, 4)
Vic Florencia – mixing (track 8)
Chris Shaw – engineering (tracks 1, 2, 4)
Ross Petersen – mixing (track 6), additional engineering
John Alicastro – additional engineering
Stephen Marcussen – mastering

Artwork
Bethany Crowley – art direction
Michelle Lukianovich – art direction, package design
Joe Garrad – photography
Julee Duwe – back tray photo

Charts

References

2010 albums
Thriving Ivory albums
Wind-up Records albums
Albums produced by Mark Endert